Sathappan Ramananathan Muthiah Chettiar (died 1900) was an Indian merchant, banker and philanthropist known for his work in renovating Saivite temples in India. He was the patriarch of the S. Rm. M. family. The M. Ct. family has descended from Muthiah's first son, S. Rm. M. Chidambaram Chettiar.

Early life 

Muthiah Chettiar was born in Kanadukathan in about 1840 to Ramanathan Chettiar, an important leader of the Nagarathar community of Chettinad. Muthiah Chettiar had little education.

Work 

At an early age, Muthiah Chettiar entered the family profession of banking. He extended his activities to Ceylon, Burma and Malaya and made a huge fortune.

Philanthropy 

Muthiah Chettiar is remembered by most other member of the S. Rm. family for his philanthropical activities. He spent lakhs of rupees to renovate the Nataraja Temple at Chidambaram. He financed the construction and maintenance of the Arudra Dharsanam choultry in Chidambaram. He also constructed the Nagarathar choultry near the Dasaswamedha Ghat in Benares.

Death 

Muthiah Chettiar died in about 1900.

Family 

Muthiah Chettiar had three sons

 S. Rm. M. Chidambaram Chettiar
 S. Rm. M. Ramaswami Chettiar
 S. Rm. M. Annamalai Chettiar

References 

 

1840 births
1900 deaths
Indian bankers
Indian merchants
19th-century Indian philanthropists